In aviation, the term tractor configuration refers to an  aircraft constructed in the standard configuration with its engine mounted with the propeller in front of it so that the aircraft is "pulled" through the air. Oppositely, the pusher configuration places the airscrew behind and propels the aircraft forward. Through common usage, the word "propeller" has come to mean any airscrew, whether it actually propels or pulls the plane.

In the early years of powered aviation both tractor and pusher designs were common. However, by the midpoint of the First World War, interest in pushers declined and the tractor configuration dominated. Today, propeller-driven aircraft are assumed to be tractors unless it is stated otherwise.

Origins
The first airplane to have a "tractor" configuration was the Goupy No.2 (first flight on 11 March 1909) designed by Mario Calderara and financed by Ambroise Goupy at the French firm Blériot Aéronautique. When it was constructed, it was the fastest airplane in existence. At that time a distinction was made between a propeller ("pushes the machine", akin to a ship's propeller) and a tractor-[air]screw ("pulls the machine through the air"). The Royal Flying Corps called the tractors "Bleriot type" after Louis Bleriot to distinguish them from pushers, or "Farman type".

World War I military aviation
The downside of a single-engine tractor aircraft was that it was initially impossible to fire a gun through the propeller arc without striking the propeller blades. Early solutions included mounting guns (rifles or machine guns) to fire around the propeller arc, either at an angle to the side – which made aiming difficult – or on the top wing of a biplane so that the bullets passed over the propeller arc.

The first system to fire through the propeller was developed by French engineer Eugene Gilbert for Morane-Saulnier, and involved fitting metal "deflector wedges" to the propeller blades of a Morane-Saulnier L monoplane. It was employed with immediate success by French aviator Roland Garros and was also used on at least one Sopwith Tabloid of the Royal Naval Air Service.

A more workable solution was a gun synchronizer, which utilized a synchronization gear developed by aircraft pioneer Anthony Fokker and fitted to the Fokker E.I monoplane in 1915. The first British "tractor" to be specifically designed to be fitted with synchronization gear was the Sopwith 1½ Strutter which did not enter service until early 1916.

Other solutions to avoiding the propeller arc include passing the gun's barrel through the propeller's hub or spinner  – first used in production military aircraft with the World War I French SPAD S.XII – or mounting guns in the wings. The latter solution was generally used from the early 1930s until the beginning of the jet age.

References

See also
Pusher configuration
Push-pull configuration

Aircraft configurations